2 Towns Ciderhouse is an American artisan craft brewery of cider, based in Corvallis, Oregon. Established in 2010, the business produces large quantities of cider each year.

History

Establishment 

2 Towns Ciderhouse, also referred to as 2 Towns, was launched in 2010 by three Oregonians — Lee Larsen, a graduate in finance from Oregon State University, Dave Takush, a fermentation science graduate from the same school, and graphic designer Aaron Sarnoff-Wood, a graduate of the University of Oregon. 

Sarnoff-Wood initially wanted to start a brewpub and contacted his friend Larsen, who shared a love for home brewing, to discuss the idea. However, high projected startup costs made this idea impractical, and the concept was abandoned.

The pair became interested in the fermentation of apple cider to create hard cider. A test batch was made to be served in 2009 at Larsen's brother's wedding, which proved extremely popular with guests — and the trio launched a commercial enterprise specializing in the beverage.

2 Towns Ciderhouse was launched in 2010 from a 1,000 square foot space in the Eastgate Business Center, located between Corvallis and Albany, Oregon. Despite the firm's location between the cities of Corvallis and Albany, the brand name was actually a reference to the college towns of Corvallis and Eugene, from which the three founding partners hailed.

The company sold approximately 100 cases a month during its first year of operations.

Expansion

In 2012, the company moved to a 10,000-square-foot space in the same industrial park from which the company was launched. 2 Towns has production contracts with several orchards and launched its own orchard in 2012.

Product line

The first two varieties released commercially by 2 Towns Ciderhouse were "Incider", a semi-sweet beverage, and "Bad Apple". 

Other specialty varieties are made, however, including a pear cider-based beverage and other creations using a range of additive flavoring ingredients, such as cinnamon, and ginger.

In addition to its year-round product line, 2 Towns makes specialized seasonal varieties and sometimes makes use of barrel-aging techniques associated with the making of wine and liquor.

2 Towns products are distributed in 22-ounce bottles, 12-ounce cans, and kegs. The company's total production for 2013 was estimated at 4,500 barrels (140,000 gallons).

Marketing

In 2014, 2 Towns signed on as an official sponsor of the Portland Timbers of Major League Soccer. According to the terms of the deal, 2 Towns products would be available from multiple taps at all Timbers games and at other sporting events at Providence Park in Portland, including soccer games of the Portland Thorns FC.

Awards

 Gold medal, 2014 US Open Beer Championship

See also
 Brewing in Oregon
 List of cider brands

Footnotes

Further reading

 Drew Beechum, The Everything Hard Cider Book. Avon, MA: Adams Media, 2013.
 James Crowden, Cider: The Forgotten Miracle. Somerton, England: Cyder Press Two, 1999.
 Gary A. Moulton, Hard Cider Production and Orchard Management in the Pacific Northwest. Pullman, WA: Washington State University, 2010.
 Annie Proulx and Lew Nichols, Cider: Making, Using and Enjoying Sweet and Hard Cider. Pownal, VT: Storey Communications, 1997.
 Ben Watson, Cider, Hard and Sweet: History, Traditions, and Making Your Own. Woodstock, VT: Countryman Press, 1999.

External links
 

2010 establishments in Oregon
Food and drink companies established in 2010
American ciders
Companies based in Corvallis, Oregon
Privately held companies based in Oregon
Beer brewing companies based in Oregon